Peltella is a genus of air-breathing, tropical semi-slugs, terrestrial pulmonate gastropod molluscs in the family Bulimulidae. It occurs in the Atlantic neotropical South America, being endemic to the humid tropical and subtropical forests of southeastern Brazil. The animals have pale pink to yellow general body coloration with white streaks (e.g., Peltella iheringi) and are devoid of an external shell.

Species
The genus includes the following species:
 Peltella palliolum (Férussac, 1821)
 Peltella iheringi Leme, 1968

References

Bulimulidae
Gastropod genera